Joseph Nii Laryea Afotey-Agbo (born July 31, 1967) is a Ghanaian politician and was the Greater Accra Regional Minister of Ghana. Prior to this, he was the Volta Regional Minister. He is a  member of the seventh Parliament of the Fourth Republic of Ghana representing the Kpone-Katamanso Constituency in the Greater Accra Region on the ticket of the National Democratic Congress.

Personal life 
He is a Christian (Presbyterian). He is married (with seven children).

Early life and education 
Afotey-Agbo was born on July 31, 1967. He hails from Katamanso-Nungua, a town in the Greater Accra Region of Ghana. He graduated from Ghana Institute of Journalism and obtained his diploma degree in public relations.

Politics 
Afotey-Agbo is a member of the National Democratic Congress (NDC). He is the member of Parliament representing Kpone-Katamanso Constituency in the 4th, 5th, 8th, and the current and 7th Parliament of the 4th Republic of Ghana. Serving as a committee member in committees on Environment, Science and Technology Committee, Youth, Sports and Culture Committee, and Privileges Committee. He served as the Minister of States between 2009 and 2012. He also served as Regional Minister of Greater Accra Region between 2012 and 2014.

Career 
He is the managing director (MD) of JNL Afotey-Agbo Ventures. He has been a Member of Parliament from January 2005 till date.

References

Living people
Ghanaian Presbyterians
National Democratic Congress (Ghana) politicians
1967 births
Ghanaian MPs 2005–2009
Ghanaian MPs 2009–2013
Ghanaian MPs 2013–2017
Ghanaian MPs 2017–2021
Ghanaian MPs 2021–2025